The Oscar Pettiford Orchestra in Hi-Fi is an album by bassist/cellist and composer Oscar Pettiford which was recorded in 1956 and first issued on the ABC-Paramount label. The album was reissued on CD on Impulse! Records as Deep Passion in 1994 combined with The Oscar Pettiford Orchestra in Hi-Fi Volume Two.

Reception

The Allmusic site awarded the album 3 stars.

Track listing 
All compositions by Oscar Pettiford except where noted.
 "The Pendulum at Falcon's Lair" - 3:04
 "The Gentle Art of Love" - 3:41
 "Not So Sleepy" (Mat Mathews) - 4:58
 "Speculation" (Horace Silver) - 4:10
 "Smoke Signal" (Gigi Gryce) - 4:22
 "Nica's Tempo" (Gryce) - 3:53
 "Deep Passion" (Lucky Thompson) - 3:45
 "Sunrise-Sunset" - 4:03
 "Perdido" (Juan Tizol, Ervin Drake, Hans Lengsfelder) - 4:08
 "Two French Fries" (Gryce) - 2:52    
Recorded in New York City on June 11, 1956 (tracks 6 & 7), June 12, 1956 (tracks 3, 5, 8 & 9) and June 19, 1956 (tracks 1, 2, 4 & 10)

Personnel 
Oscar Pettiford - bass, cello
Art Farmer, Ernie Royal - trumpet
Jimmy Cleveland - trombone
David Amram, Julius Watkins - French horn
Gigi Gryce - alto saxophone, arranger
Lucky Thompson - tenor saxophone, arranger
Jerome Richardson - tenor saxophone, flute
Danny Bank - baritone saxophone
Janet Putnam - harp (tracks 1-5)
Tommy Flanagan - piano
Whitey Mitchell - bass (track 5) 
Osie Johnson- drums

References 

Oscar Pettiford albums
1956 albums
ABC Records albums
Impulse! Records albums